Even Higher is a book describing the future of TV broadcasting, as predicted by various industry figures.

Published in 2012 by Broadgate Publications in Richmond, London, United Kingdom, Even Higher  is the follow-up volume to High Above - The untold story of Astra, Europe's leading satellite company, which describes the birth and growth of the European satellite provider Société Européenne des Satellites (SES), and was published in 2010 for SES' 25th anniversary.

It is a large "coffee table" style book (32 x 24 cm) of 176 pages with hundreds of photographs.

Content 
While High Above looked back at the history of broadcasting and the role of satellites in the expansion of television, Even Higher explores the future of broadcasting. It looks forward at the next 25 years and how the television industry is changing to accommodate second screens and social media, as well as how broadcasters and industry insiders expect that future to look. 

The contributors to Even Higher are the thinkers, the planners and the creatives who are now determining the shape of broadcasting's future, and in the book explain their expectations as to the future shape of broadcasting. They examine in detail the future for broadcast programming, given the brief to look forward as much as 25 years at broadcasting's future and highlight some of the developments and plans now taking place across the industry and to examine how they will affect our lives. In addition, Even Higher includes whimsical chapters looking back on 25 years of broadcasting developments from the year 2037, written by broadcasting technology journalists, Geoff Bains, Julian Clover, and Jörn Krieger.

The book acknowledges that in the broadcasting industry, looking forward 25 months is a challenge, let alone 25 years, not only because of the developing technologies involved but also because of influences outside the direct broadcasting industry, such as Twitter, Facebook and YouTube which have a huge effect on broadcasting today but were almost unknown just ten years ago.

Excerpts from Even Higher:

 The only sure thing about looking into the crystal ball like this is that you will not be proved wrong for at least a quarter of a century! To me the most significant changes that have happened to our industry over the past 25 years and which will doubtless continue over the next 25 concern the nature of broadcasting itself - Adrian Scott, Bakewell House Consultancy

 Not too long ago, forecasters announced that traditional television broadcasting is dead. The most prominent voice among the doomsayers was one of our modern icons, Bill Gates, the great technology pioneer of the 20th century. He predicted that everything – television, internet, videos, applications and e-commerce – will soon converge into a single device: The personal computer. On the one hand, he was right. This convergence is indeed happening. But it is not happening on the personal computer. In fact, the PC is having an ever harder time prevailing against the upcoming dominance of tablets, laptops and smart phones - Ferdinand Kayser, SES, Luxembourg

 The path to a new multi-platform, multi-screen future will not be easy. Dramatic shifts need to take place and that brings new challenges - Simon Frost, Ericsson

 We now find ourselves in the middle of a smartphone and tablet revolution, where consumers increasingly – and rightly – expect the content they engage with at home to be available to them on-the-go - Robin Crossley, BSkyB

 The future of TV, is TV! To paraphrase Mark Twain, the reports of TV’s death have been greatly exaggerated. If everything preached by internet visionaries or predicted by consulting firms were true, TV would already be dead - Gerhard Zeiler, TBS

 Broadcasting is going through its greatest evolution since John Logie Baird first demonstrated the potential of television in the 1920s - Mark Hollinger, Discovery International

 Mankind is witnessing another revolution in media. Media consumption today has become a lot smarter, not only by name but also in its overall value proposition - Stephan Heimbecher, Sky Deutschland

 Predicting the future of broadcasting is hard because we must know how our society might evolve, which is itself a very difficult task. As a broadcaster, our target is to provide Ultra-high-definition television (UHDTV) broadcast service to homes from 2020 through satellite broadcasting in the 21 GHz band. The speed of technological innovation is much faster nowadays. What took us 20 years to do in the case of HDTV, we achieved in 10 years for UHDTV - Dr Keiichi Kubota, NHK, Japan.

Authors 
High Above is edited by Chris Forrester with contributions from some of the best-known names in the industry, including Gerhard Zeiler (RTL and now TBS), Mark Hollinger (Discovery), Dr Abe Peled (NDS/Cisco), Greg Moyer (Scripps). Jean-Yves Le Gall (Arianespace), David Wood (European Broadcasting Union), David Mercer (Strategy Analytics) and Dr Kaiichi Kubota (NHK) along with broadcasting technology journalists, Geoff Bains, Julian Clover, and Jörn Krieger

See also 

 High Above (book)
 Beyond Frontiers (book)
 SES 
 Astra 
 Satellite television

References

External links 
 Highlights of SES history
 Official Astra consumers/viewers' website
 Official SES trade/industry site

2012 non-fiction books
Books about television
Satellite television
Television technology